Álvaro López may refer to:

 Álvaro López (canoeist) (born 1952), Spanish sprint canoeist
 Álvaro López (footballer) (born 1998), Argentine forward
 Álvaro López (musician) (born 1979), drummer from British post trip hop band Second Person
 Alvaro Lopez (born 1951), Mexican boxer